The 2015 World Men's Handball Championship was the 24th staging of the World Men's Handball Championship, organised by the International Handball Federation (IHF). The final tournament was held for the first time in Qatar, from 15 January to 1 February 2015. The Qatari bid was selected over those of Norway, Poland and France after a vote by the IHF Council on 27 January 2011, in Malmö, Sweden. 
This was the third time that the World Championship was hosted in the Middle East And North Africa, after Egypt in 1999 and Tunisia in 2005. 

France won the final against Qatar 25–22 to win their fifth title, a first in handball history while Qatar won their first ever medal.
Poland captured the bronze medal by defeating Spain 29–28 after extra time. Denmark secured the fifth place by winning against Croatia which finished sixth and thus had the worst result in the past 13 years of international handball competing.

The competition was marred by numerous controversies throughout.

Venues
The games of the tournament were played in Doha and in the newly created town of Lusail.

Three new venues were constructed for the tournament:
Lusail Sports Arena in the town of Lusail: with a capacity of 15,300 seats, Lusail hall became the main venue of the tournament. The hall opened in November 2014.
Ali Bin Hamad Al Attiya Arena in al-Sadd district of Doha with a capacity of 7,700 seats. The hall is part of the al-Sadd Club sports complex. 
Duhail Handball Sports Hall in Duhail district of Doha with a capacity of 5,500 seats. The hall is part of the Qatar Handball Association (QHA) complex.

Qualification
Twenty-four teams participated in the final tournament. Qatar, as hosts and Spain, as world champions, were automatically qualified, which left 22 places available for the best teams of each continental qualification tournament and the winners of an additional European qualification competition.

In a decision taken by the International Handball Federation on 8 July 2014 the spot allocated for a nation from Oceania was revoked on the grounds that Oceania has no continental confederation. The national team, qualified for this spot through the 2014 Oceania Handball Championship, was Australia. The spot was instead handed out as a wild card to the nation with the highest ranking at the previous world championships not qualified for the Qatar tournament. This nation was Germany. Bahrain and the United Arab Emirates withdrew on 7 November 2014. Iceland and Saudi Arabia were chosen as the replacements.

Qualified teams

1 Bold indicates champion for that year
2 Italics indicates host country for that year
3 From both German teams only East Germany was qualified in 1990

Draw
The draw was held on 20 July 2014 at 21:30 local time in Doha, Qatar.

Seedings
The seedings were published on 11 July 2014.

Squads

Each team selects 16 players for the tournament.

Referees
18 referee pairs are selected:

Preliminary round
The schedule was published on 21 August 2014. A new schedule was released on 12 December 2014. The top four teams from each group advanced to the knockout stage.

Tie-breaking criteria
For the group stage of this tournament, where two or more teams in a group tied on an equal number of points, the finishing positions will be determined by the following tie-breaking criteria in the following order:
 number of points obtained in the matches among the teams in question
 goal difference in the matches among the teams in question
 number of goals scored in the matches among the teams in question (if more than two teams finish equal on points)
 goal difference in all the group matches
 number of goals scored in all the group matches
 drawing of lots

All times are local (UTC+3).

Group A

Group B

Group C

Group D

Knockout stage

Championship

Round of 16

Quarterfinals

Semifinals

Bronze medal game

Final

5–8th place playoffs

5–8th place semifinals

Seventh place game

Fifth place game

President’s Cup

17–20th place playoffs

21–24th place playoffs

Placement semifinals

23rd place game

21st place game

19th place game

17th place game

Statistics

Top goalscorers

Source: IHF.info

Top goalkeepers

Source: IHF.info

Final ranking

{| class="wikitable" 
!width=40|Rank
!width=180|Team
|- bgcolor=#ccffcc
|align=center| ||align="left"|
|- bgcolor=#bbf3ff
|align=center| ||align="left"|
|- bgcolor=#ccccff
|align=center| ||align="left"|
|- bgcolor=#ccccff
|align=center|4 ||align="left"|
|- bgcolor=#ccccff
|align=center|5 ||align="left"|
|- bgcolor=#ccccff
|align=center|6 ||align="left"|
|- bgcolor=#bbf3ff
|align=center|7 ||align="left"|
|- bgcolor=#ccccff
|align=center|8 ||align="left"|
|- bgcolor=#ccccff
|align=center|9 ||align="left"|
|- 
|align=center|10 ||align="left"|
|- 
|align=center|11 ||align="left"|
|- bgcolor=#bbf3ff
|align=center|12 ||align="left"|
|- 
|align=center|13 ||align="left"|
|- bgcolor=#bbf3ff 
|align=center|14 ||align="left"|
|- 
|align=center|15 ||align="left"|
|- 
|align=center|16 ||align="left"|
|- 
|align=center|17 ||align="left"|
|- 
|align=center|18 ||align="left"|
|- 
|align=center|19 ||align="left"|
|- 
|align=center|20 ||align="left"|
|-
|align=center|21 ||align="left"|
|- 
|align=center|22 ||align="left"|
|- 
|align=center|23 ||align="left"|
|- 
|align=center|24 ||align="left"|
|}

All-Star Team
All-Star Team of the tournament:
Goalkeeper: 
Right wing: 
Right back: 
Centre back: 
Left back: 
Left wing: 
Pivot:

Other awards
Most Valuable Player: 

The final rankings were used in the 2016 Summer Olympics qualification process. France, as World Champion, qualified for the Olympics. The next 6 teams earned a place in the Olympic Qualification Tournaments. Qatar and Germany, however, won their continental tournaments (qualifying them directly for the Olympics) and thus their spots in the Olympic Qualification Tournaments went to Slovenia and Macedonia.

Controversy

Withdrawal of teams
As mentioned under qualifications, Australia lost its spot in the tournament due to an IHF decision, being replaced by Germany, who did not qualify. Further, Bahrain and United Arab Emirates withdrew.

Qatar player naturalisation
A large number of players in the Qatar team had been naturalised in the years leading up to the championship. According to IHF rules, to gain eligibility for a new national team, a player cannot have played for another nation for three years in an official match. This allowed several foreign-born players, including Spanish-born Borja Vidal, Goran Stojanović and Jovo Damjanović from Montenegro, and Bertrand Roiné who previously played for France, to play for the Qatar team at the championship. According to the Frankfurter Allgemeine, only four of the 17 players in the squad were native to Qatar.

Head of the Qatar Handball Federation, Ahmed Mohammed Abdulrab Al Shaabi, acknowledged the policy in a statement in June 2013, saying "We're a small nation with limited human resources, so we had to bring players from outside in the past." He also announced an end to the policy at the time, adding however that they "[might] make an exception only in the case of an experienced goalkeeper." In January 2014, Danish sports agent Mads Winther said he had met with "contacts involved with Qatar" regarding the possibility of naturalising Danish players.

The practice was criticised by Austrian goalkeeper after his team's loss to Qatar in the round of 16, saying "It [felt] like playing against a world selection team" and "I think it is not the sense of a world championship." At a press conference during the championship, Qatar head coach Valero Rivera declined to comment on the matter. Spanish player Joan Cañellas did not think it was an issue, saying "If they can do it, why not."

After the controversial semi-final against Poland, and reaching the final as a result, the practice was even more criticised, with players such as Danijel Šarić having now represented four different national teams.

Paid fans
Qatar flew in about 60 Spanish fans to cheer for Qatar during the championship.

Refereeing

During the first 12 matches of the tournament, 143 two-minute suspensions were awarded by the referees, a figure that came under strong criticism from teams, who had not been informed of the IHF Referee Committee's instructions to referees commanding them to keep a strict disciplinary line.

The referees were widely accused of being one-sided in favour of the hosts. Especially at the matches against Austria, Germany and Poland. After the final whistle, the Polish players showed their discontent by ironically applauding the three referees.

See also
 2015 IHF Emerging Nations Championship

References

External links
Official website
IHF website

World Handball Championship tournaments
World Men's Handball Championship
World Men's Handball Championship
Al Daayen
Sports competitions in Doha
International handball competitions hosted by Qatar
World Men's Handball Championship
World Men's Handball Championship
21st century in Doha